Telopea railway station was a railway station in Sydney, Australia, that was opened in 1925. It is located on the Carlingford line, and served the suburb of Telopea. It was served by Sydney Trains T6 Carlingford line services. The Carlingford railway line closed on 5 January 2020, and the station was demolished in May of that year

History
Telopea was an infill station, opening on 13 June 1925.

The Camellia to Carlingford section of the Carlingford railway line is being converted to light rail as part of the Parramatta Light Rail project with the line closed on 5 January 2020.

Platforms & former services
At the time the station closed the platform had the following services:

Transport links
State Transit operated one route via Telopea station:
545: Parramatta station to Macquarie Park station via Eastwood

Telopea railway station was served by one NightRide route:
N61: Carlingford station to Town Hall station

References

External links

Telopia station details Transport for NSW

Disused railway stations in Sydney
Railway stations in Australia opened in 1925
Railway stations closed in 2020
2020 disestablishments in Australia
City of Parramatta